Emad Bouanane (born 1984) is a French footballer. Originally signed by manager Brian Flynn to play as a left back for Wrexham Football Club, Emad Bouanane quickly became a favourite amongst the Wrexham supporters.

After leaving Wrexham 
Having been released from the Red Dragons in the summer of 2001 due to financial problems, Emad went on to have a failed trial at another football league side, Swindon Town F.C. He spent a year living in Birmingham before signing for fifth-tier French club SC Abbeville. He scored on his début in a 2-0 victory against AC Cambrai.

References

http://www.soccerbase.com/players_details.sd?playerid=22026
http://www.redpassion.co.uk/oldsite/issue28/emad.htm
http://www.redpassion.co.uk/oldsite/news/news2607c.htm
http://news.bbc.co.uk/sport1/hi/football/eng_div_2/986720.stm

1984 births
Living people
French footballers
US Avranches players
Wrexham A.F.C. players
SC Abbeville players
Association football defenders